Camas School District No. 117 is a public school district in Clark County, Washington and serves the city of Camas. As of October 2018, the district had a total enrollment of 6,903 total students Camas School District is rated #9 out of 205 of Washington's districts as rated by SchoolDigger.

Demographics
As of October 2018, Camas School District contained 50.6% male students and 49.4% female students. The ethnicity for Camas School District:  0.3% Native American/Alaskan Native; 7.3% Asian; 0.8% African American; 9.0% Hispanic; 0.2% Native Hawaiian; 74.0% Caucasian; and 8.4% two or more races. The percentage of teachers with at least a master's degree was 83.4%. $10,519 dollars are spent on each student per year, and there is a 89.3% on student graduation rate.

The superintendent as of 2022 is John Anzalone

Schools

High schools
Camas High School
Hayes Freedom High School
Discovery High School

Middle schools
Skyridge Middle School
Liberty Middle School
Odyssey Middle School

Primary schools
Dorothy Fox Elementary School
Helen Baller Elementary School
Grass Valley Elementary School
Lacamas Lake Elementary School
Prune Hill Elementary School
Woodburn Elementary School

Contact
 Phone: (360) 335-3000
 Location: 841 NE 22nd Ave Camas, WA 98607-1148

References

External links

Camas, Washington
School districts in Washington (state)
Education in Clark County, Washington
School districts established in 1994
1994 establishments in Washington (state)